Laura Diaz (born April 27, 1975) is an American professional golfer. 

Diaz was born Laura Philo in Scotia, New York. She won the 1995 North and South Women's Amateur at Pinehurst. In 1996 she won the Eastern Women's Amateur Championship and made it to the quarterfinals of the 1996 U.S. Women's Amateur. A business student at Wake Forest University, Diaz was named the university's 1997 Female Athlete of the Year.

Diaz turned professional in 1997 and spent three years playing on the Futures Tour where she scored three tournament wins. She also played on the Ladies European Tour, where she was rookie of the year in 1998. She joined the LPGA Tour in 1999 and has earned two victories, both coming in the 2002 season when she had ten top-10 finishes. She has played on four Solheim Cup teams (2002, 2003, 2005, 2007).
 
Prior to 2000, she competed as Laura Philo before marrying her husband, Kevin Diaz, and taking his last name. Laura's brother, Ron Philo Jr., is a PGA Professional who made the cut at the 2005 PGA Championship.

Professional wins (6)

LPGA Tour wins (2)

Futures Tour wins (3)
1997 Weston Hills FUTURES Classic
1998 SunTrust FUTURES Classic, Eaglebrooke FUTURES Championship

Legends Tour wins (1)
2021 BJ's Charity Championship (with Jan Stephenson)

Results in LPGA majors

^ The Women's British Open replaced the du Maurier Classic as an LPGA major in 2001.
^^ The Evian Championship was added as a major in 2013.

CUT = missed the half-way cut
"T" = tied

Summary
Starts – 59
Wins – 0
2nd-place finishes – 1
3rd-place finishes – 2
Top 3 finishes – 3
Top 5 finishes – 5
Top 10 finishes – 8
Top 25 finishes – 16
Missed cuts – 23
Most consecutive cuts made – 6
Longest streak of top-10s – 2

Team appearances
Professional
Solheim Cup (representing the United States): 2002 (winners), 2003, 2005 (winners), 2007 (winners)

References

External links

American female golfers
Wake Forest Demon Deacons women's golfers
LPGA Tour golfers
Ladies European Tour golfers
Solheim Cup competitors for the United States
Golfers from New York (state)
People from Schenectady County, New York
1975 births
Living people